Doctor Who News is an independent source of news about the BBC Television programme Doctor Who, and its spin-off series Torchwood, The Sarah Jane Adventures, and Class.

The site, which was part of Outpost Gallifrey before its closure, is one of the most popular sites featuring Doctor Who news and has been cited as a source by websites such as TV Squad and io9. The Doctor Who News Page is produced by a team of reporters and editors, and is affiliated with the Gallifrey Base Doctor Who discussion forum.  In 2011, the Doctor Who News Page won SFX magazine's "SFX Blog Award", in the category of "Best SF News Blog".

The site is linked to This Week in Doctor Who, a compendium of Doctor Who and Doctor Who-related broadcasts worldwide, originally compiled by Benjamin F Elliott from 1998 to 2011, and Doctor Who in the Media, which gathers links to news stories and other Doctor Who-related media coverage.

References

External links
The Doctor Who News Page
This Week in Doctor Who
Doctor Who Reviews

Doctor Who fandom
Science fiction websites